Putsuri is a village in Manteswar CD block in Kalna subdivision of Purba Bardhaman district in West Bengal, India.

Demographics
As per the 2011 Census of India Putsuri had a total population of 6,806, of which 3,448 (51%) were males and 3,358 (49%) were females. Population below 6 years was 817. The total number of literates in Putsuri was 4,120 (68.79% of the population over 6 years).

Transport
Approx. 35 km from the nearest railway station at Memari on Howrah-Bardhaman main line. Mode of travel - bus or car from Memari station.

Education
Putsuri Iswar Prasanna Institution, a coeducational higher secondary school, is affiliated with West Bengal Council of Higher Secondary Education for higher secondary classes. Putsuri Girls’ High School is affiliated with the West Bengal Board of Secondary Education.

Culture
Putsuri is famous for its special type of sweets "Monda". Many people come from far away places to buy "Monda". Sada's monda is very special among all the "Monda" shops. 
Baba Thakur's (Panchanan) mandir is one of the attraction for the tourist coming here specially Tuesday and Saturday.

Healthcare
There is a primary health centre at Putsuri.

References 

Villages in Purba Bardhaman district